Paidia griseola is a moth of the family Erebidae. It was described by Walter Rothschild in 1933. It is found in North Africa and on Sicily.

References

Nudariina
Moths described in 1933